Jack Anderson (born October 12, 1998) is an American football offensive guard for the New York Giants of the National Football League (NFL). He was selected with the 236th pick of the 2021 NFL Draft. He played college football at Texas Tech.

College career
Anderson was ranked as a fourstar recruit by 247Sports.com coming out of high school. He committed to Texas Tech on October 5, 2015.

Professional career

Buffalo Bills
Anderson was drafted by the Buffalo Bills with the 236th pick of the 2021 NFL Draft on May 1, 2021. On May 13, 2021, Anderson signed his four-year rookie contract with Buffalo. He was waived on August 31, 2021 and re-signed to the practice squad the next day.

Philadelphia Eagles
On September 21, 2021, Anderson was signed off the Bills' practice squad to the Philadelphia Eagles active roster. He was placed on injured reserve on November 20. He was activated on December 21. He was waived on August 30, 2022 as part of the final roster cuts.

New York Giants
On August 31, 2022, Anderson was claimed off waivers by the New York Giants.

On February 15, 2023, Anderson re-signed on a one-year contract.

References

External links
New York Giants bio
Texas Tech bio

1998 births
Living people
People from Frisco, Texas
Players of American football from Texas
Sportspeople from the Dallas–Fort Worth metroplex
American football offensive guards
Texas Tech Red Raiders football players
Buffalo Bills players
Philadelphia Eagles players
New York Giants players